Telmatobius degener is a species of frog in the family Telmatobiidae. It is endemic to the La Libertad Region of Peru and only known from its type locality between Otuzco and Huamachuco, at  asl. The type locality is in the very humid subalpine páramo. The frogs were active by day and found in pools and running water in a densely vegetated roadside marsh in an open pasture.

The threats to this species are currently unknown, although chytridiomycosis could be a threat.

References

degener
Amphibians of the Andes
Amphibians of Peru
Endemic fauna of Peru
Páramo fauna
Amphibians described in 1993
Taxonomy articles created by Polbot